Hugh Barr Miller, Jr. (January 10, 1910 – June 21, 1978) was a U.S. Naval officer in the Pacific Theater during World War II, who after being shipwrecked and left for dead behind enemy lines, single-handedly fought the Japanese for weeks until his rescue. The only authorized biography, by his son Landon C. G. Miller, is available for sale on Amazon under the title "Lt. Hugh Barr Miller, Jr – The US Navy's One Man Army". There are a large number of other books, comic books, and sections of books that include Miller's heroic saga, Including the authoritative "100 Best True Stories of World War II", Hardcover – 1945. A recently published book by Steven Harding on the incident is currently being adapted for production for a major Hollywood film.

Biography

Early years and college football career
In college, Miller was the quarterback of the University of Alabama’s Crimson Tide football team, playing in the 1931 Rose Bowl, earning him the nickname "Rose Bowl" on his ship. At the outbreak of World War II, he was appointed as an Officer, and was eventually sent to serve in the Pacific.

World War II
Miller's ship, the USS Strong, was sunk by a Japanese torpedo in the Solomon Islands on the night of July 4–5, 1943, leaving Miller in the water with 22 other men.

Three days later, Miller washed up on Arundel Island with three shipmates (some had died in the water while still others had been separated at night). After hiding from the enemy for days, Miller eventually ordered the other three men to take his boots and knife, and leave him behind, given his severely-wounded condition. He said later, "I thought I was dying, but then I rallied..." The others did leave him behind, attempting to return to U.S.-held territory. They were never heard from again.

Miller, though, recovered from his wounds, some of which remained with him for the rest of his life. Eventually, he found a washed ashore body of a Japanese soldier, and took his hand grenades and bayonet. These Japanese hand grenades were first used to ambush and kill at least half a dozen enemy soldiers on patrol who had gotten too close to his hideout. He then began to systematically attack Japanese machine gun nests, usually manned by 5 soldiers, using just the hand grenades, all while stranded and alone. Eventually he accounted for over 20 men, all killed by Miller without a rifle or handgun, just recovered grenades and the bayonet. Forty three days after the torpedo attack, Miller signaled to a passing U.S. plane and later that day was rescued by a U.S. Navy J2F Duck float plane.

After his ordeal, Miller was personally awarded many medals in a ceremony with Eleanor Roosevelt, the wife of then President Roosevelt, and Fleet Admiral William "Bull" Halsey. Now famous, there were  numerous newspapers, comic books, magazines (including LIFE Magazine) and TV shows recounting this epic story, including the weekly TV Show, This Is Your Life, which was hosted by future US President Ronald Reagan, and the TV show "Navy Log". Miller was twice recommended for the Medal of Honor, but it was never granted. He was, however, awarded the Navy Cross, 2 Silver Stars, 6 Bronze Stars, 2 Purple Hearts, and 27 other individual and unit decorations.

Numerous books recount Miller's biography. The self-published, only authorized biography, book by son Landon C.G. Miller, titled Lt. "Rose Bowl" Miller: The U.S. Navy's One Man Army., the many other publications as noted above, and the latest version,  Castaway's War The book Castaway's War was optioned in 2016 by film production company Gold Circle.

Miller's ordeal has been documented by National Geographic channel's 'Ultimate Survival World War II', episode 'Desert Island Manhunt' with Hazen Audel.

References 

1910 births
1978 deaths
United States Navy personnel of World War II
University of Alabama alumni
United States Navy officers